Freyre may refer to:

People 

 Fernando Freyre de Andrade (1903–1946), Spanish actor 
 Gilberto Freyre (1900–1987), Brazilian sociologist
 Ricardo Jaimes Freyre (1868–1933), Bolivian author
 Susana Freyre, Argentine actress

Other uses 

 Rafael Freyre, Cuba, municipio in Cuba